Artistry in Voices and Brass is an album by the Stan Kenton Orchestra revisiting their popular compositions with new lyrics composed by Milt Raskin and arranged by Pete Rugolo for an 18-member vocal chorus and trombone section recorded in 1963 and released by Capitol Records.

Reception

The Allmusic review by Lindsay Planer noted "the results are predictably mixed. ...This proves the old adages that sometimes newer [read: more modern] isn't always better, and too many cooks do indeed spoil the proverbial sonic stew".

Track listing
All compositions by Stan Kenton and Milt Raskin except where noted.
 "Flame" (Rugolo, Raskin) - 2:17
 "Moonlove" (Kenton, Rogolo, Raskin) - 4:26
 "Painted Rhythm" - 3:27
 "These Wonderful Things" - 3:30
 "Eager Beaver" - 2:25
 "Daydreams in the Night" - 2:32
 "Concerto (Of Love)" - 5:38
 "Solitaire" (Bill Russo, Kenton, Raskin) - 3:54
 "It's Love" - 3:15
 "Night Song" - 2:21
Recorded at Capitol Studios in Hollywood, CA on April 19, 1963 (tracks 4-6) and September 10, 1963 (tracks 1-3 & 7-10).

Personnel
Stan Kenton - piano
Edwin "Buddy" Baker (tracks 1-3 & 7-10), Milt Bernhart (tracks 4-6), Bob Curnow (tracks 1-3 & 7-10), Bob Fitzpatrick (tracks 4-6), Kent Larsen (tracks 4-6), Jiggs Whigham (tracks 1-3 & 7-10) - trombone
Jim Amlotte - bass trombone
Dave Wheeler - bass trombone, tuba
Milt Raskin - piano (tracks 4 & 6)
Laurindo Almeida - guitar
Don Bagley (tracks 4-6), John Worster (tracks 1-3 & 7-10) - bass 
Dee Barton - drums 
Larry Bunker - percussion
Jacqueline Allen (tracks 4-6), Sue Allen, Betty Jane Baker, Earl Brown (tracks 1-3 & 7-10), Evangeline Carmichael, Peggy Clark, William Cole, Allan Davies, Jimmy Joyce, Thomas Kenny (tracks 4-6), Bill Lee, Virginia Mancini (tracks 1-3 & 7-10), Jay Meyer, Loulie Jean Norman, Bernie Parke, Thurl Ravenscroft (tracks 1-3 & 7-10), Charles Schrouder (tracks 4-6), William Stafford (tracks 4-6), Sally Sweetland, George Aliceson Tipton (tracks 1-3 & 7-10), Gloria Wood - vocal chorus
Pete Rugolo - arranger, conductor

References

Stan Kenton albums
1964 albums
Capitol Records albums
Albums conducted by Pete Rugolo
Albums arranged by Pete Rugolo
Albums recorded at Capitol Studios
Albums produced by Lee Gillette